The twelfth season of Food Paradise, an American food reality television series narrated by Jess Blaze Snider on the Travel Channel, premiered on August 27, 2017. First-run episodes of the series aired in the United States on the Travel Channel on Mondays at 10:00 p.m. EDT. The season contained 13 episodes and concluded airing on November 12, 2017.

Food Paradise features the best places to find various cuisines at food locations across America. Each episode focuses on a certain type of restaurant, such as "Diners", "Bars", "Drive-Thrus" or "Breakfast" places that people go to find a certain food specialty.

Episodes 
Note: These episodes aired from August 27, 2017 November 12, 2017.

Big Easy Eats

Route 66

BBQ Bragging Rights

Blue Plate Special

The Meatier The Better

Fully Loaded

Meltdown

Scary Good

Shore Bets

Happy Hour

Spicy

Hotel Hot Spots

Open 24 Hours

References

External links
Food Paradise @Travelchannel.com

2017 American television seasons